Gyodaklu or Gyodak’lu or Gedaklyu may refer to:
Nerkin Gyodaklu, Armenia
Verin Gyodaklu, Armenia
Gödəkli, Azerbaijan